The 2020 Atlanta Reign season was the second season of the Atlanta Reign's existence in the Overwatch League and the team's second under head coach Brad "Sephy" Rajani. Atlanta planned to host two homestand weekends in the 2020 season, with the first at the Coca-Cola Roxy in late March and the second at a different, undetermined location in mid-June, but all homestand matches were canceled due to the COVID-19 pandemic.

The Reign finished in the quarterfinals in each of the three midseason tournaments of the 2020 season. After advancing through the North America play-ins to the season playoffs, Atlanta was eliminated from North America playoff bracket by the Florida Mayhem.

Preceding offseason

Organizational changes 
In late October, the Reign announced the departure of player development coach Cas "Casores" van Andel. The following month, Atlanta picked up GC Busan Kim "Mentalist" Chung-in as an assistant coach.

Roster changes 
The Reign enter the new season with no free agents, nine players which they have the option to retain for another year, and one player under contract. The OWL's deadline to exercise a team option is November 11, after which any players not retained will become a free agent. Free agency officially began on October 7.

Acquisitions 
The Reign's first signing of the offseason was announced on October 31, when the team promoted tank Xander "Hawk" Domecq from their academy team ATL Academy. In addition, the team also announced that tank Blake "Gator" Scott would no longer be on a two-way contract with ATL Academy and would strictly play for the Reign. On November 12, the team announced the signing of GC Busan Wave DPS Kim "Edison" Tae-hoon. The team added another DPS three days later when they signed Hugo "SharP" Sahlberg from Team Envy. The Reign announced their full roster for the 2020 season on January 31, which included the promotion of former Reign support player Steven "Kodak" Rosenberger from ATL Academy and signing of support player Anthony "Fire" King.

Departures 
The Reign's first departure was on October 30, when it was announced that support player Daniel "FunnyAstro" Hathaway had been signed to the Philadelphia Fusion. The following week, on November 8, the team announced that they would not pick up off-tank  Seo "Daco" Dong-hyung's option for another season of play. The following day, the team also elected not to exercise their option to retain DPS Ilya "NLaaeR" Koppalov.

Roster

Transactions 
Transactions of/for players on the roster during the 2020 regular season:
On July 17, DPS Andrej "Babybay" Francisty retired.
On July 18, support Steven "Kodak" Rosenberger retired.
On July 24, the Reign signed DPS Garrett "Saucy" Roland.
On July 31, the Reign signed support Kim "Lr1s" Seung-hyun.

Standings

Game log

Regular season

Midseason tournaments 

| style="text-align:center;" | Bonus wins awarded: 0

Postseason

References 

Atlanta Reign
Atlanta Reign
Atlanta Reign seasons